A Different Kind of Blues is a 1980 album by Itzhak Perlman and André Previn. It contains compositions by Previn.

Reception

The album was reviewed by Richard S. Ginnel at Allmusic who wrote of Previn and Perlman that "the two classical partners actually made a really charming album the first time around" and compared Previn to "...the proverbial bicyclist who took a long sabbatical but never forgot how to ride", writing that he "still had plenty of keyboard invention in his fingers, and his tunes are consistently witty" and Perlman as "...not quite swinging but creating an alluring illusion of jazz feeling". Ginnel credits the album with anticipating "the rash of 'crossover' albums by classical artists that didn't take hold until late in the 1980s. And it remains more enjoyable than the vast majority of its successors".

Track listing
All music written by André Previn
"Look at Him Go" – 3:54
"Little Face" – 4:16
"Who Reads Reviews" – 4:15
"Night Thoughts" – 6:22
"A Different Kind of Blues" – 6:24
"Chocolate Apricot" – 5:04
"The Five of Us" – 2:55
"Make up Your Mind" – 3:51

Personnel
André Previn – piano
Itzhak Perlman – violin
Jim Hall – guitar
Red Mitchell – double bass 
Shelly Manne – drums

Production
Barry Golin – art direction
Marvin Schwartz – cover design
Rick Rankin – cover photo, photography
Michael Sheady – engineer
David Mermelstein – liner notes  
Don Hunstein – photography
Suvi Raj Grubb – producer

References

1980 albums
André Previn albums
Angel Records albums
Itzhak Perlman albums